Niki and Gabi Take Bahamas is an American reality web series. It premiered on AwesomenessTV on April 18, 2020, starring American acting and singing duo Niki and Gabi and follows their trip to the Bahamas. Niki and Gabi Take Bahamas is the fifth season of Niki and Gabi Spring Break that originally premiered in 2017.

Synopsis 
Twin web stars and actresses Niki and Gabi escape the suburbs for a vacation to the Bahamas with a few of their best friends.

Background 
The series follows the DeMartino sisters on a trip with their friends to the Bahamas. The series caused online drama between the twins when Niki posted topless pictures with Gabi and their friends, which Gabi objected to. Further drama occurred between some of the other cast members, such as Alex DeMartino and Rachel Weiss, after Alex alleged Weiss shoved her. While their friends attempted to ease tensions between Niki and Gabi, their relationship was strained, due in part to a video of Niki discussing how she felt compared to Gabi, released in November 2019. 
Their relationship improved after COVID-19 pandemic forced them to physically separate for a period of time.

Cast

Main 

 Gabi DeMartino
 Niki DeMar
 Alex DeMartino
 Collin Vogt
 Nate West

Supporting 

 Alex Byrd
 Jessie Marie
 Wot Dennis
 Kyle Werner
 Rachel Weiss

Episodes 
All episodes information taking from AwesomenessTV.

References 

Awesomeness (company)
2020s American reality television series